Capitec Bank is a South African retail bank. As of August 2017 the bank was the second largest retail bank in South Africa, based on number of customers, with 120,000 customers opening new accounts per month.

Overview
 
The bank maintains 850 retail branches nationwide, 3418 own or partnership ATMs and has over 6.2 million customers, according to the 2015 Chief Financial Officer's Report. Of these customers, 309 000 are online banking customers and 3.5 million are mobile banking customers.

According to the annual results for the 2015 financial year, the asset base of Capitec Bank was in excess of R53.9 billion, with R11.6 billion in equity, and with retail savings deposits increasing by 32 percent for the year to R19.3 billion and retail fixed savings increasing by 19 percent to R10.7 billion for the year. Earnings and headline earnings for the 2015 financial year amounted to R2.547 billion compared to R2.017 billion in 2014, and net transaction fee income amounted to R2.6 billion.

The bank offers its clients the Global One account, which is a transacting/savings account and credit facility rolled into one.

When it comes to customer satisfaction as per the results by South African Customer Satisfaction Index (SAcsi) in 2015, Capitec Bank comes first with 82.2 points. Capitec Bank has emerged as the best bank in the world by International banking advisory group Lafferty in its inaugural Bank Quality Rankings.

As of February 2017 "the majority, more than 5.5 million, of Capitec clients pay[ed] less than R50 per month in bank costs."

Business model 
The bank operates as a retail bank that serves both individuals and businesses, but does not provide business banking for close corporations, companies, partnerships or trusts. It claims to focus on simplifying the banking experience, according to their literature.

Capitec's business model is focused on providing a value to its customer(s) by providing low costs, giving customers the freedom to pay as they transact, and by offering the highest interest rate on deposits.

See also

List of banks in South Africa
Johannesburg Stock Exchange
Economy of South Africa

References

External links

Banks of South Africa
2001 establishments in South Africa
Companies based in Stellenbosch
Companies listed on the Johannesburg Stock Exchange
Banks established in 2001